Shaley Vally is a village in Wangdue Phodrang District in central Bhutan.

References

External links
Satellite map at Maplandia.com

Populated places in Bhutan